HMS Vimiera was a V-class destroyer ordered as part of the 1917–18 programme.

Early activity
One of her early missions was a trip to Reval, conveying Leonid Krasin and Viktor Nogin back to the Russian Socialist Federal Soviet Republic, following the first stage of negotiations in the Anglo-Soviet Trade Agreement.

Second World War
Vimiera was chosen for conversion to an escort destroyer (WAIR) with an enhanced anti-aircraft and anti-submarine capability as part of the naval rearmament programme preceding the outbreak of war in September 1939. Conversion was complete, whereon in January 1940 she joined the Nore Command for coastal convoy escort duty in the North Sea and English Channel. Her company was formed largely of men from the Clyde Division of the Royal Naval Reserve, HMS Graham.

In April 1940 she was transferred under the Commander-in-Chief, Dover to support military operations in France. This included the Battle of Dunkirk to providing additional anti-aircraft defence in Dunkirk (Operation FA) and assisting in the evacuation of allied personnel from Flushing. With  she provided naval gunfire support for military operations at Escault. She was taken into repair on 25 May 1940, and so was not involved in the evacuation from Dunkirk. She was subsequently redeployed to the North Sea in defence of East Coast convoys.

In December 1941, she was adopted by the civil community of Sandbach, Cheshire, following the successful Warship Week National Saving campaign. Vimiera, under the command of Lieutenant-Commander Angus Alexander Mackenzie, RNR, was sunk by a mine in the Thames estuary off East Spile Buoy on 9 January 1942 with the loss of around 96 hands. 92 or 93 went down with the ship, and a further four of the 38 survivors died of wounds. Eight of her nine officers survived, and Lt. Cdr. Vimiera's loss was commemorated on a memorial within .

Notes

Bibliography

External links
 HMS Vimiera
 V&W Destroyer Association (HMS Vimiera)
 "For Whom the Bell Tolls" - The Living and the Dead - V&W Destroyer Association (HMS Vimiera) 

 

V and W-class destroyers of the Royal Navy
Ships built by Swan Hunter
Ships built on the River Tyne
1917 ships
World War I destroyers of the United Kingdom
World War II destroyers of the United Kingdom
Ships sunk by mines
Maritime incidents in January 1942
World War II shipwrecks in the North Sea